This is a discography of Mandisa, an African-American gospel and contemporary Christian artist. In her career she has released six studio albums, including one Christmas album. Her first album True Beauty debuted at number one on the Top Christian Albums chart, and at number 47 on the Billboard Top 200. She also released a Christmas EP entitled Christmas Joy on November 20, 2007. In 2008, she released her second studio album, a full length Christmas album, entitled It's Christmas, debuting at number 37 on the Top Christian Albums chart, and at number 44 on the Top Holiday Albums. In 2009, she released her third full-length studio album entitled Freedom. In 2011 she released her fourth studio album, What If We Were Real, followed in 2013 by Overcomer, her most successful album to date, reaching number 29 on the Billboard 200 album chart. In 2017, Out of the Dark was released, becoming her third album to top the Top Christian Albums chart.

Studio albums

Compilation albums

Remix albums

EPs

Music videos
 Freedom (2009)

 "He Is With You" - 3:56

 What If We Were Real (2011)

 "Stronger" - 3:44

 Overcomer (2013)

 "Overcomer" - 3:49

References

Discographies of American artists
American Idol discographies
Christian music discographies